Svätopluk Sýkora (born 11 August 1925) was a Slovak racewalker. He competed in the men's 50 kilometres walk at the 1960 Summer Olympics.

References

External links
  

1925 births
Possibly living people
Athletes (track and field) at the 1960 Summer Olympics
Slovak male racewalkers
Olympic athletes of Czechoslovakia
People from Čadca
Sportspeople from the Žilina Region